Brazil has many traditional games.

Traditional games

Bete-ombro 
Bete-ombro, also known by several other names such as taco or bets, is a form of street cricket. Two teams of two players compete, with one player throwing a ball at an opponent, who tries to hit it with a bat and then switch places with their partner in order to score.

Bola de gude 
This is a game where players flick marbles at other marbles in order to capture them, with the player capturing the most marbles by the end of the game winning.

Cinco Marias 
This game is a version of knucklebones.

Luta de galo 
Players keep a handkerchief hanging out of their waist, and must hop on one leg while keeping the opposite arm stuck to their chest. Players lose if their raised foot touches the ground, if they allow their arm to come off their chest, or if their handkerchief is snatched by the opponent.

References 

Brazil-related lists